Alice Sola Kim is an American science fiction writer living in Brooklyn, New York. Kim was a 2016 Whiting Award recipient. Her writings have appeared in McSweeney's Quarterly, The Magazine of Fantasy & Science Fiction, Tin House, Lenny Letter, Asimov's Science Fiction, Buzzfeed, and Strange Horizons. Kim's works include short stories like “We Love Deena" and "Hwang's Billion Brilliant Daughters.”

Biography 
Kim was raised in Seattle, Washington. Kim received a B.A. from Stanford University in 2006 and an M.F.A. from the Creative Writing Program at Washington University in St. Louis in 2011.

Awards and honors 
In 2016, Kim was selected as one of ten recipients of the annual Whiting Awards. Kim has received grants and scholarships from the MacDowell Colony, Bread Loaf Writers’ Conference, and the Elizabeth George Foundation. Vice described Kim as part of a "Subversive New Generation of Asian American Writers." In 2018, her horror short story, "Mothers, Lock Up Your Daughters Because They Are Terrifying" was acquired by 2000 Fox and 21 Laps, the producers of the Netflix original series Stranger Things, with Kim executive producing.

Bibliography

Short fiction 
 "We Love Deena"
 "Hwang's Billion Brilliant Daughters"
 "Mothers, Lock Up Your Daughters Because They Are Terrifying"
 "Beautiful White Bodies"

Non-fiction

References

External links

Living people
21st-century American women writers
American women short story writers
Asimov's Science Fiction people
Stanford University alumni
Washington University in St. Louis alumni
Women science fiction and fantasy writers
Writers from Brooklyn
Year of birth missing (living people)